Snehal Pramod Jadhav (born 17 October 1989) is an Indian cricketer who plays for Maharashtra in domestic cricket. She is a right handed wicket-keeper-batter.

Domestic career 
She has played 1 First-class, 37 List A and 31 Women's Twenty20 matches. She has represented  West zone, Hyderabad and Odisha apart from Maharashtra. She retired from cricket on 2015.

Personal life 
She married Indian cricketer Kedar Jadhav on 25 June 2011. The couple have a daughter, born on 2015.

References

External links 

1989 births
Maharashtra women cricketers
West Zone women cricketers
Living people